From There to Here – a soundtrack album by British rock band I Am Kloot, written for the drama television series under the same title. The record was released on 24 November 2014 through Kudos Records/Caroline Records.

The material consists of 16 new instrumental tracks and three songs known from the previous discography of the band. For the first time I Am Kloot members worked as individuals on the same project, corresponding via emails. The bassist, Peter Jobson, has described this process as a „refreshing” experience after „fifteen years of recording all together in one room”.

It was the second time when the screenwriter Peter Bowker decided to use music by I Am Kloot. The first was in the medical drama television series Monroe – which included three songs known from the previous studio albums by the band. The band's music was again featured prominently in Bowker's 2016 drama The A Word.

Except for the standard CD edition, a limited number of signed CDs and vinyls has been released. This is the final record before their dissolutions in 2016.

Track listing 
 Track lengths according to iTunes

References 

I Am Kloot albums
2014 soundtrack albums
Caroline Records soundtracks
Television soundtracks
Soundtracks by British artists